KEES (1430 AM) is a Catholic religious radio station, paired with an FM translator, licensed to Gladewater, Texas. Affiliated with the Guadalupe Radio Network, it is owned by La Promesa Foundation.

Translator

History
1430 signed on the air in 1947. It was assigned the call sign KSIJ and had a power of 500 watts. In the 1950s KSIJ had a top 40/Country format that featured the station manager and program director, Tom Perryman. Thanks to Tom, KSIJ became the first station in Texas to have Elvis Presley on the air. Due to the geographic location of Gladewater and KSIJ Tom was able to get new up-and-comers from The Louisiana Hayride in Shreveport as well as the performers from the Reo Palm Isle Club in Longview. Tom brought Elvis, Willie Nelson, Ray Price, Jim Reeves, Floyd Cramer, and Johnny Horton to the station on the air and had the station promote and arrange their concerts. Tom Perryman built KSIJ into the top station in Gregg County due to his hard work and influence in the music business. Tom Perryman later went to WSM and the Grand Ole Opry, then to KGRI Henderson, Texas, and is now on KKUS 104.1 the Ranch in Tyler, Texas.

In the 1970s, 1430 added another tower and powered up to 5,000 watts daytime and 1,000 watts night.

In the 1980s, Matt Williams bought the station and changed it from a music station to talk on AM. Williams later sold KEES to Citadel. Citadel in turn sold 1430 KEES, 600 KTBB, 1330 KDOK, 92.1 KDOK-FM, and 1490 KGKB to Paul Gleiser.

Gleiser simulcasted KTBB on KEES, as the 600 signal did not cover Gregg county very well. The simulcast ended in 2006, when Gleiser sold KEES and KGLD 1330 to its current owners Salt Of The Earth Broadcasting of Baytown, Texas.

Effective December 3, 2020, Salt of the Earth Broadcasting sold KEES to LA Promesa Foundation for $125,000.

References

External links

Gospel radio stations in the United States
Radio stations established in 1947
1947 establishments in Texas
EES